The Art of War III: Retribution is a 2009 American direct-to-video action film directed by Gerry Lively and starring Treach, Warren Derosa, Sung-Hi Lee and Leo Lee. It is the third installment in The Art of War film series. It is the sequel to The Art of War II: Betrayal, though was the first sequel to that film to be produced. The film had a negative critical reception.

Plot
Agent Neil Shaw (Treach), who has returned to working for the United Nations, assassinates an arms dealer in downtown Los Angeles and also kills a suicide bomber who was there as part of an unrelated plot, but is reprimanded by his superior, Gaines, for his indiscreetness in doing so. Shaw is nonetheless sent on a mission to South Korea, which is a few days away from a peaceful reunion with North Korea, though the process is threatened by North Korean separatists who are rumored to be buying a nuclear weapon from Russian arms dealers. The mission quickly goes wrong when one of the two agents under Shaw's command is spotted and shot dead by a sniper, resulting in a firefight in which Shaw finds a woman named Sun Yi (Sung-Hi Lee) with the arms dealers; he considers her to be out of place, and captures her in order to get answers out of her, though the second agent under Shaw's command is also killed as they leave the scene.

Shaw and his remaining agent, Jason (Warren Derosa) attempt to interrogate Sun Yi, but find that she knows nothing of importance. Shaw then tries to contact Gaines, who has just arrived in South Korea, but men working for the arms dealer intercept and kill Gaines, and plant evidence to frame Shaw for his murder. Shortly afterwards, Kim (Leo Lee), one of the men at the earlier meeting, arrives with several men under his command, leading to a firefight in which Shaw kills two of Kim's men before he, Jason and Sun Yi escape the scene. After getting to a hotel in the local red light district, Shaw concludes, over Jason's objections, that the best course of action is to break into Seoul's United Nations branch and personally appeal to the Secretary-General. That night Shaw and Sun Yi make love, but are interrupted by the arrival of more armed men, who Shaw is forced to kill.

The following day, Shaw and Sun Yi enter the United Nations building in disguise, with Jason providing surveillance. Before they go into the building, however, Sun Yi knowingly gives Jason's location away to some waiting assassins, and while he's ultimately able to fend off their attack, they destroy the equipment in the van, forcing Jason to follow Shaw and Sun Yi into the building. After fighting off the security guards, Shaw and Sun Yi get to the Secretary-General's office, and are surprised to find that Kim is there, along with the Secretary-General, the South Korean ambassador and several guards. Kim reveals that he is actually a Secret Service agent who has been working with the United Nations to track down the arms dealer, who in reality is none other than Sun Yi. On having her cover blown, Sun Yi grabs Shaw's gun and quickly kills everyone in the room except for Shaw and the Secretary-General. This leads to a gunfight in which Shaw and Sun Yi unsuccessfully try to kill each other before Jason enters and distracts Sun Yi long enough for Shaw to incapacitate her.

Disillusioned by the recent events, Shaw tells the Secretary-General that he's leaving the United Nations' employ, this time for good, but she refuses to allow him to do so, saying that he's far too valuable an asset.

Cast

 Anthony "Treach" Criss as SAD Agent Neil Shaw
 Warren Derosa as SAD Agent Jason
 Lee Sung Hi as Sun Yi
 Janet Carroll as Secretary General Barnes
 Leo Lee as Kim
 Charles Rahi Chun as Byung Hoon
 Brian Fitzpatrick as Agent Gibs
 Jack Conley as Gaines
 David Basila as Wakeen
 David Frye as Detective Halpin
 John P. Gulino as Harold Zimmer
 Lovake Heyer as Samad
 Brett A. Jones as Bates
 Cathy Shim as Cara Shim
 Toshi Toda as Jung
 J. Anthony Pena as Anderson
 Bach Hoang as Blond Prostitute (uncredited)

Production

Development
The film was actually produced before The Art of War II: Betrayal, but shelved after Wesley Snipes contacted the producers about returning to the series. Though consideration was initially given to releasing it as a stand-alone film named "Intervention", it was ultimately released as the third Art of War film.

Reception

Critical response
The film received a strongly negative critical reaction. DVDtalk called the film "complete garbage", judging it to be very poorly executed overall, with particular criticism for the action sequences and Treach's performance. The Movie Scene had similar criticisms, describing the action as "boringly pedestrian", accusing Treach of having no charisma, and also finding Warren Derosa's performance to be annoying. Movieman's Guide described the plot as "frankly nonsensical and just plain stupid", and criticised the poorly-staged gunfights, particularly at the film's climax.

References

External links
 

2009 films
2009 direct-to-video films
2009 action films
Direct-to-video sequel films
American action films
2000s Korean-language films
Films set in Gyeonggi Province
Films set in Los Angeles
The Art of War films
2000s English-language films
Films directed by Gerry Lively
2000s American films